"The Mummers' Dance" is a song written and performed by Canadian Celtic fusion singer Loreena McKennitt, released as a single from her sixth studio album, The Book of Secrets (1997), in November 1997. The song refers to the seasonal mummers' play performed by groups of actors, often as house-to-house visits. Its lyrics indicate a springtime holiday.

As remixed by electronic music production duo DNA, "The Mummers' Dance" reached number 10 in Canada and  18 on the Billboard Hot 100, No. 3 on the Adult Top 40 chart, and No. 1 on the Adult Alternative Songs chart. It was used as the theme for the TV series Legacy. It was also used in the trailer for the film Ever After, starring Drew Barrymore, and in the soundtrack of the Brazilian telenovela Corpo Dourado. A music video was also produced for the selection.

Track listings

Charts

Weekly charts

Year-end charts

Release history

References

External links
 Loreena McKennitt's website
 The Mummers' Dance Lyrics
 

1997 singles
1997 songs
Songs about dancing
Television drama theme songs
Warner Records singles